Pseudagoma is a monotypic moth genus of the family Noctuidae. Its only species, Pseudagoma pinheyi, is found in Mozambique. Both the genus and species were first described by Sergius G. Kiriakoff in 1975.

References

Agaristinae
Monotypic moth genera